Maxwell House International is a brand of flavored instant coffee beverages produced by the Maxwell House coffee division of the Kraft Foods corporation, based in the United States.

The product line was introduced in the early 1970s as General Foods International Coffee, a brand belonging to what was then General Foods. The first three flavors at launch were Cafe Au Lait (later renamed to Cafe Francais), Suisse Mocha, and Cafe Vienna. The line, sold in small tins, was marketed as a premium product, and remained a strong seller through the 90’s.

"General Foods International Coffees" underwent a name change in late 2005 to simply "General Foods International" in order to accommodate recent additions of non-coffee based beverages (Chai Latte and Vanilla Creme). In 2009, it began to carry a "From the makers of Maxwell House" secondary label. During the summer of 2010, this product line was rebranded as Maxwell House International Cafés.

Ingredients
The ingredient list for Cafe Vienna, as an example, is: sugar, nondairy creamer (partially hydrogenated soybean oil, corn syrup solids, sodium caseinate (from milk), dipotassium phosphate, mono- and diglycerides, soy lecithin), instant coffee, sodium citrate, natural and artificial flavor.

References

External links

Maxwell House International Cafés at Kraft website

Kraft Foods brands
Drink brands
Coffee brands
Coffee companies of the United States